Teuchophorus is a genus of flies in the family Dolichopodidae.

Species

 Teuchophorus acinaces Meuffels & Grootaert, 2004
 Teuchophorus acuminatus Grootaert, 2006
 Teuchophorus amami (Bickel, 1999)
 Teuchophorus angulus Wei & Yang, 2007
 Teuchophorus anomalicerus (Hollis, 1964)
 Teuchophorus anomalus Meuffels & Grootaert, 2004
 Teuchophorus antennatus Grootaert, 2006
 Teuchophorus armatulus Meuffels & Grootaert, 1986
 Teuchophorus balearicus (Tsacas, 1960)
 Teuchophorus bipilosus Becker, 1908
 Teuchophorus bipilosus bipilosus Becker, 1908
 Teuchophorus bipilosus cupreoobscurus Santos Abreu, 1929
 Teuchophorus bisetus Loew, 1871
 Teuchophorus brachystigma Meuffels & Grootaert, 2004
 Teuchophorus bulohensis Grootaert, 2006
 Teuchophorus calcaratus (Macquart, 1827)
 Teuchophorus caprivi Grichanov, 2000
 Teuchophorus chaetifemoratus Pollet & Kechev, 2007
 Teuchophorus chaetulosus Meuffels & Grootaert, 2004
 Teuchophorus clavigerellus Wheeler, 1899
 Teuchophorus condylus Harmston & Knowlton, 1946
 Teuchophorus conspicuus Meuffels & Grootaert, 1986
 Teuchophorus costalis Meuffels & Grootaert, 1986
 Teuchophorus cristulatus Meuffels & Grootaert, 1992
 Teuchophorus crobylotus Meuffels & Grootaert, 2004
 Teuchophorus cteniuchus Meuffels & Grootaert, 2004
 Teuchophorus ctenomerus Meuffels & Grootaert, 2004
 Teuchophorus dentatus Wei & Yang, 2007
 Teuchophorus denticulatus Meuffels & Grootaert, 1986
 Teuchophorus digitatus Meuffels & Grootaert, 1986
 Teuchophorus diminucosta Harmston & Knowlton, 1946
 Teuchophorus dimorphus Meuffels & Grootaert, 2004
 Teuchophorus elongatus Wang, Yang & Grootaert, 2006
 Teuchophorus emeiensis Yang & Saigusa, 2000
 Teuchophorus enormis Meuffels & Grootaert, 2004
 Teuchophorus ensicornis Meuffels & Grootaert, 2004
 Teuchophorus eurystigma Meuffels & Grootaert, 2004
 Teuchophorus femoratus Meuffels & Grootaert, 1986
 Teuchophorus fimbritibia Meuffels & Grootaert, 2004
 Teuchophorus fluvius Wei, 2006
 Teuchophorus fracidus Wei & Yang, 2007
 Teuchophorus fulvescens Meuffels & Grootaert, 2004
 Teuchophorus fuscicornis Meuffels & Grootaert, 1986
 Teuchophorus fuscihalteratus Meuffels & Grootaert, 2004
 Teuchophorus gissaricus Negrobov & Grichanov, 1982
 Teuchophorus gladiator Meuffels & Grootaert, 2004
 Teuchophorus grandis Meuffels & Grootaert, 2004
 Teuchophorus gratiosus (Becker, 1924)
 Teuchophorus grandior Meuffels & Grootaert, 1986
 Teuchophorus guangdongensis Wang, Yang & Grootaert, 2006
 Teuchophorus gymnogynus Meuffels & Grootaert, 2004
 Teuchophorus hirsutus Meuffels & Grootaert, 2004
 Teuchophorus humilis Meuffels & Grootaert, 2004
 Teuchophorus israelensis Grichanov, Negrobov & Selivanova, 2012
 Teuchophorus katudatae Meuffels & Grootaert, 2004
 Teuchophorus krabiensis Meuffels & Grootaert, 2004
 Teuchophorus laingensis Meuffels & Grootaert, 1986
 Teuchophorus laosensis Olejnichek, 2003
 Teuchophorus leigongshanus Wei & Yang, 2007
 Teuchophorus limosus Grootaert, 2006
 Teuchophorus litoralis Meuffels & Grootaert, 2004
 Teuchophorus longifrons Bickel, 1983
 Teuchophorus longipecten Meuffels & Grootaert, 2004
 Teuchophorus longisetosus Meuffels & Grootaert, 2004
 Teuchophorus medovoensis Kechev, Negrobov & Grichanov, 2014
 Teuchophorus meieri Grootaert, 2006
 Teuchophorus miles Meuffels & Grootaert, 2004
 Teuchophorus minor Meuffels & Grootaert, 2004
 Teuchophorus miricornis Meuffels & Grootaert, 2004
 Teuchophorus modestus Meuffels & Grootaert, 2004
 Teuchophorus monacanthus Loew, 1859
 Teuchophorus moniasus (Wei, 2006)
 Teuchophorus monochaetus Negrobov, Grichanov & Shamshev, 1984
 Teuchophorus neesoonensis Grootaert, 2006
 Teuchophorus nigrescus Yang & Saigusa, 2000
 Teuchophorus nigricosta (von Roser, 1840)
 Teuchophorus notabilis Meuffels & Grootaert, 2004
 Teuchophorus obliquus Meuffels & Grootaert, 2004
 Teuchophorus obscurus Meuffels & Grootaert, 2004
 Teuchophorus ornatuloides Meuffels & Grootaert, 2004
 Teuchophorus ornatulus Meuffels & Grootaert, 2004
 Teuchophorus paradoxipus Stackelberg, 1931
 Teuchophorus parcearmatus Meuffels & Grootaert, 1986
 Teuchophorus parmatus Meuffels & Grootaert, 2004
 Teuchophorus parvus Meuffels & Grootaert, 2004
 Teuchophorus pauper Meuffels & Grootaert, 2004
 Teuchophorus pectinatus Meuffels & Grootaert, 1986
 Teuchophorus peltastes Meuffels & Grootaert, 2004
 Teuchophorus phthorimosus Wei & Yang, 2007
 Teuchophorus pseudobipilosus Negrobov, Grichanov & Shamshev, 1984
 Teuchophorus pusio Meuffels & Grootaert, 1986
 Teuchophorus qianus Wei & Yang, 2007
 Teuchophorus quadratus Meuffels & Grootaert, 1986
 Teuchophorus quadrisetosus Naglis, 2009
 Teuchophorus queenslandicus Bickel, 1983
 Teuchophorus rifensis Nourti, Grichanov & Kettani, 2019
 Teuchophorus rohdendorfi Stackelberg, 1927
 Teuchophorus rozkosnyi Olejnichek, 1981
 Teuchophorus samraouii Grootaert, Stark & Meuffels, 1995
 Teuchophorus simplex Mik, 1880
 Teuchophorus simplicipes De Meijere, 1916
 Teuchophorus simplicissimus Meuffels & Grootaert, 2004
 Teuchophorus sinensis Yang & Saigusa, 2000
 Teuchophorus singaporensis Grootaert, 2006
 Teuchophorus sirdenus Wei & Yang, 2007
 Teuchophorus spatulifer Meuffels & Grootaert, 1986
 Teuchophorus spinigerellus (Zetterstedt, 1843)
 Teuchophorus spinulosus Grootaert, 2006
 Teuchophorus stenostigma Meuffels & Grootaert, 2004
 Teuchophorus taiwanensis Wang, Yang & Grootaert, 2006
 Teuchophorus temasek Grootaert, 2006
 Teuchophorus tianmushanus Yang, 2002
 Teuchophorus tiomanensis Grootaert, 2006
 Teuchophorus trangensis (Bickel, 1999)
 Teuchophorus uncinatus Meuffels & Grootaert, 1986
 Teuchophorus ussurianus Negrobov, Grichanov & Shamshev, 1984
 Teuchophorus utahensis Harmston & Knowlton, 1942
 Teuchophorus vanaartseni Meuffels & Grootaert, 1986
 Teuchophorus ventralis Yang & Saigusa, 2000
 Teuchophorus vexillifer Meuffels & Grootaert, 2004
 Teuchophorus yingdensis Wang, Yang & Grootaert, 2006
 Teuchophorus yunnanensis Yang & Saigusa, 2001
 Teuchophorus zhuae Wang, Yang & Grootaert, 2006

References 

 Europe
 Nearctic

Dolichopodidae genera
Sympycninae
Diptera of Europe
Taxa named by Hermann Loew